Henry Leland Bowles (January 6, 1866 – May 17, 1932) was an American politician who served as a United States representative from Massachusetts.

Biography
Bowles was born in Athens, Vermont on January 6, 1866.  He attended the district schools at Kendricks Corner and Vermont Academy.  At the age of eighteen, he moved to Osage, Iowa and engaged in agricultural pursuits.  He later moved to California, where for four years he worked as lumberjack, rancher, and farmer.

Bowles returned east and settled in Massachusetts, working at various businesses in Waltham, Salem and Lynn.  He was a trustee of the Vermont Academy, and moved to Springfield in 1898, where he operated a chain of restaurants.

He was elected a member of the Massachusetts Governor's Council in 1913, 1918 and 1919, and was a delegate to the Republican National Conventions in 1920 and 1924.

He was elected as a Republican to the Sixty-ninth Congress to fill the vacancy caused by the death of George B. Churchill.  Bowles was reelected to the Seventieth Congress and served from September 29, 1925 to March 3, 1929.  He was not a candidate for renomination in 1928 and resumed his former business pursuits.

In 1928, he purchased the Orange Grove Plantation on Saint Helena Island near Frogmore, Beaufort County, South Carolina.

He died in Springfield May 17, 1932 and was interred in Springfield Cemetery.

References

External links

1866 births
1932 deaths
Vermont Academy alumni
People from Athens, Vermont
Republican Party members of the United States House of Representatives from Massachusetts
American restaurateurs
People from Osage, Iowa
People from Saint Helena Island, South Carolina